El Cerrito del Norte station (Spanish for "The Northern Little Hill") is a Bay Area Rapid Transit (BART) station located on Cutting Boulevard in El Cerrito, California. The station is near San Pablo Avenue and Interstate 80. It serves as a regional transit hub for local AC Transit bus services, and for commuter feeder services from Solano, Napa, and Marin Counties in the North Bay plus western Contra Costa County. Opened in 1973, the station was renovated in 2017–2021 to add additional elevators, stairs, and lobby space.

The station features large parking areas throughout, including surface parking and a four-story parking garage on the east side. There are also reserved bicycle lockers and open air racks available. There is a kiss and ride and taxi zone on the east side of the station.  The Ohlone Greenway runs through the station area.

History

El Cerrito del Norte station opened on January 29, 1973 when service began between MacArthur station and Richmond station. As with El Cerrito Plaza station, the escalator walls feature tile mosaics by Alfonso Pardiñas.

A 2004 study recommending expanding the station paid area, platforms, and vertical logistics (more stairs and elevators within the paid area) to allow more passengers to use the station and decrease dwelling times during congested alighting times. By 2017 the station had more than 9,000 passengers boarding per weekday, exceeding its design capacity. BART approved contracts to begin station expansion that year, with an expected completion in May 2019. 

The expanded paid area, new elevators and stairs, and updated bus boarding area were completed in February 2021. The second phase of the renovation, which included new restrooms and a new busway, was completed on March 29, 2021. It also included the installation of El Cerrito Homes, two porcelain tile murals by artist Kyungmi Shin.

Redevelopment
BART developed a station improvement plan in 2004 to create a transit village in the surrounding area. The city of El Cerrito is additionally planning and searching for funds to develop the area around the station as a transit oriented development (TOD) similar to other transit villages, with the reservation that the development must be appropriately scaled. An apartment complex to be built on a former parking area was approved in 2017.

Bus connections

El Cerrito del Norte station serves as the primary northern bus terminal for the Richmond branch due to its proximity to I-80 (compared to the Richmond BART station). By 2017, there were 29 bus bays that serve six bus agencies for fixed route service and various paratransit and dial-a-ride shuttles. The bus bays are predominantly located on the west side of the station. Many stops have been relocated to surrounding streets during construction.

AC Transit provides local and limited-stop service, plus two commuter routes serving San Francisco:
Local: 7, 72, 72M, 76, 376
Rapid: 72R
All Nighter: 800
Transbay route (on San Pablo Avenue): L

Five operators provide commuter-oriented express service from western Contra Costa County, Marin County, Napa County, and Solano County:
FAST SolanoExpress: Green Express
Golden Gate Transit: 580, 704
Napa VINE: 29
SolTrans SolanoExpress: Red Line, Green Express Line
WestCAT: JL, JPX, JR

References

External links 

BART - El Cerrito del Norte Station
BART - El Cerrito del Norte Station Modernization

Bay Area Rapid Transit stations in Contra Costa County, California
Stations on the Orange Line (BART)
Stations on the Red Line (BART)
Brutalist architecture in California
El Cerrito, California
Railway stations in the United States opened in 1973
Bus stations in Contra Costa County, California